Eupithecia apparatissima is a moth in the family Geometridae. It is found in Nepal.

References

Moths described in 1988
apparatissima
Moths of Asia